The Sons of the Marquis Lucera (Italian: I figli del marchese Lucera) is a 1939 Italian comedy film directed by Amleto Palermi and starring Armando Falconi, Caterina Boratto and Sergio Tofano. It is based on a play of the same name by Gherardo Gherardi.

The film was shot at Cinecittà and the Scalera Studios in Rome. The film's sets were designed by the art director Salvo D'Angelo.

The future star Mariella Lotti had a small role in the production.

Cast

References

Bibliography 
 Goble, Alan. The Complete Index to Literary Sources in Film. Walter de Gruyter, 1999.

External links 
 

1939 films
Italian comedy films
Italian black-and-white films
1939 comedy films
1930s Italian-language films
Films directed by Amleto Palermi
Films shot at Scalera Studios
Italian films based on plays
Films shot at Cinecittà Studios
1930s Italian films